The 1998–99 season was the 119th season of competitive football by Rangers.

Overview
Rangers played a total of 55 competitive matches during the 1998–99 season. They started the season under new management with Dick Advocaat replacing Walter Smith. The squad Smith had left behind was past its best so Advocaat, with the financial backing of Murray, set about rebuilding almost the entire squad.

Success quickly followed and Advocaat built a team that gave the club their first domestic treble since the 1992–93 season. The Scottish Cup was secured by a 1–0 win against Celtic and the League Cup by a 2–1 defeat of St Johnstone.

The club enjoyed its best season in Europe since 1992–93 as well, reaching the third round of the UEFA Cup before being knocked out by Italian side Parma.

Players

Appearances

List of squad players, including number of appearances by competition

|}

Transfers

In

Out

Expendure:  £35,950,000
Income:  £7,625,000
Total loss/gain:  £28,325,000

Results
All results are written with Rangers' score first.

Scottish Premier League

UEFA Cup

Scottish Cup

League Cup

League table

References

Rangers F.C. seasons
Rangers
Scottish football championship-winning seasons